Angel Arribas Lopez (born November 27, 1993, Madrid, Spain) is the youngest player to earn the FIDE Master title in Spain. He became a FIDE Master in 2007 at the age of 13. He earned the International Master (IM)  title in 2012 and grandmaster (GM) title in 2014.

He is a software engineer pursuing a master's program in cybersecurity at the University of Texas at Dallas and competing for UTD.

Notable Tournaments

References 

1993 births
Living people
Chess grandmasters
Spanish chess players
Sportspeople from Madrid